The following is a list of nations and cross-country skiers that took part in the 2019–20 Tour de Ski.

Nations
Each nation had right for a maximum of 10 start quotas per gender.

The nations entering the race will be (number of skiers in brackets):

Men

  (1)
  (1)
  (1)
  (3)
  (4)
  (9)
  (5)
  (2)
  (7)
  (5)
  (1)
  (10)
  (3)
  (1)
  (1)
  (8)
  (1)
  (1)
  (1)
  (7)
  (10)
  (1)
  (3)

Women

  (1)
  (2)
  (1)
  (1)
  (3)
  (2)
  (3)
  (5)
  (7)
  (4)
  (1)
  (10)
  (3)
  (7)
  (4)
  (1)
  (8)
  (4)
  (1)
  (6)

Skiers

By nation

Men

Women

By nationality 
The 163 skiers that competed in the 2019–20 Tour de Ski; 86 men and 77 women, originated from 25 different countries.

References

2019–20 Tour de Ski
2019